Daria "Dasha" Viktorivna Astafieva (born 4 August 1985) is a Ukrainian model, singer, and actress. Formerly of the Ukrainian pop duo NikitA, Astafieva was the 2007 Playmate of the Year for Ukrainian Playboy and the 55th Anniversary Playmate for American Playboy.

Early life

Dasha Astafieva was born in Ordzhonikidze, Ukraine in 1985. When she was a little girl, Astafieva found a copy of Playboy in a closet at her family's house. Katarina Witt was on the cover. "I was in shock because I didn’t understand how beautiful a woman’s body could be. That day, I said to myself I wanted to pose one day in the magazine," she said in a 2008 interview with AskMen, "I was 9 years old."

Career

Astafieva started to pursue a career in modeling in 2003. In 2008, Astafieva became a founding member of the Ukrainian pop music duo, NikitA. In 2007, she was named Playmate of the Year for Ukrainian Playboy. Two years later, in January 2009, Astafieva was American Playboy's Playmate of the Month. She was the 55th Anniversary Playmate, the search and selection of which were featured on episodes of The Girls Next Door. During that time, Astafieva lived at the Playboy Mansion. When Hugh Hefner told her that she was the Anniversary Playmate, Astafieva cried. In 2011, Astafieva was named spokesperson for AnastasiaDate, a dating site.

Astafieva filmed a commercial for Maxim and a Russian car manufacturer in 2016, with her NikitA partner Anastasiya Kumeyko. The commercial, which involved the two women washing a car topless, was unable to air on Ukrainian television. In 2017, Astafieva left NikitA. She releases new music regularly and performs live in Ukraine.

Personal life

Astafieva fasts once a week. She has studied Muay Thai and theater.

References

External links

 Dasha Astafieva at Playboy Blog

1985 births
Living people
People from Pokrov, Ukraine
Ukrainian female models
2000s Playboy Playmates
21st-century Ukrainian actresses
21st-century Ukrainian women singers
Ukrainian pop singers
Synth-pop singers